Kumron Chinsri (born 14 May 1988) is a professional footballer from Thailand. He currently plays for Krung Thai Bank FC in the Thailand Premier League.

He played for Krung Thai Bank FC in the 2008 AFC Champions League group stages.

Asian Champions League Appearances

References

1988 births
Living people
Kumron Chinsri
Association football midfielders
Kumron Chinsri